Don Michael Perez is a Filipino television writer, film writer, television director, and film director. He is a resident writer and director for GMA Network.

His most famous works were Mulawin, Destiny Rose and Kambal, Karibal.

Filmography

Television 
 TBA Muntik Nang Maabot Ang Langit (director)
 2022 Return to Paradise (director)
 2022 Raising Mamay (director)
 2020–2021 Love of My Life (director)
 2018–2019 Cain at Abel (as co-director)
 2017–2018 Kambal, Karibal (as creator, director)
 2017 Mulawin vs. Ravena (as creator, director)
 2016–2017 Hahamakin ang Lahat (as head director)
 2016 Once Again (as head director)
 2015 Destiny Rose (as head director)
 2015 Yagit (as additional co-director)
 2014 Strawberry Lane (as head director)
 2014 Innamorata (as head director)
 2013 With a Smile (as head writer (episodes 1–7), creative consultant (episode 8-65))
 2013 Maghihintay Pa Rin (as head director)
 2013 Bukod Kang Pinagpala (as head director)
 2012 Aso ni San Roque (as head director)
 2012 My Daddy Dearest (as head director)
 2011 Daldalita (as head director)
 2010 Bantatay (as head director)
 2009 Darna (as co-director)
 2009 Zorro (as head writer)
 2009 Dapat Ka Bang Mahalin? (as head writer)
 2009 Totoy Bato (as co-director)
 2008 Gagambino (as co-director)
 2008 Dyesebel (as co-director)
 2008 Babangon Ako't Dudurugin Kita (as head writer)
 2007 Zaido: Pulis Pangkalawakan (as head writer, co-director)
 2007 MariMar (as creative consultant)
 2007 Sinasamba Kita (as head writer)
 2007 Asian Treasures (as head writer)
 2006 Captain Barbell (as head writer)
 2006 Majika (as creative consultant)
 2005 Darna (as creative consultant)
 2004 Mulawin (as creator, head writer)
 1999 Click (as head writer)

Film 
 2009 Shake, Rattle & Roll XI: Ukay-Ukay (as Director)
 2006 White Lady (as screenplay)
 2005 Mulawin: The Movie (as screenplay)
 2004 Kuya (as screenplay)

Awards and Nominations

References

External links
 

Filipino television directors
Filipino film directors
Filipino dramatists and playwrights
Living people
Year of birth missing (living people)
Filipino screenwriters
GMA Network (company) people